Saint-Galmier is a city in eastern France. It is a commune in Loire department, and belongs to the arrondissement of Montbrison. Saint-Galmier covers an area of 19.5 square kilometers. As of January 1, 2018, it had a population of 5,737, ranking 1,903th among French communes.

Saint-Galmier, located on the river Coise, south-central Loire, is a regional central city known for the mineral water Badoit produced there.

Place name

The name of Saint-Galmier is from the Catholic saint Galmier or Baldomerus, who was a monk at the Basilica of Saint Justus in Lyon.

During the French Revolution, Saint-Galmier was renamed Fontfortville by the revolutionaries because of his religious color, where "Fontfort" means "stable fountain".

Geography

Saint-Galmier is located in southeastern France, west-central Auvergne-Rhône-Alpes and east-central Loire, about 22 kilometers from the prefecture Saint-Étienne. Towns bordering Saint-Galmier include Bellegarde-en-Forez, Chambœuf, Chazelles-sur-Lyon, Cuzieu and Saint-Médard-en-Forez.

Terrain
Saint-Galmier is located in the western foothills of Mount Lyonnais. The center of the town is located in a valley, with a relatively flat terrain, with an elevation of 357 to 551 meters.

River
The river Coise, a right tributary of the Loire, flows from east to west through the town.

Plant
Saint-Galmier belongs to the temperate deciduous forest area, which is mainly distributed on both sides of the Coise River and around the city area.

Saint-Galmier was rated as a 4-star (highest) flower city in the evaluation of the flower city.

Climate
Saint-Galmier belongs to the temperate marine climate in the Köppen climate classification.

The nearest weather station to Saint-Galmier is located in Andrézieux-Bouthéon. The following is the data of the station:

Administrative divisions
Saint-Galmier is a commune (INSEE code 42222) in the Loire department and Auvergne-Rhône-Alpes region. It is part of the arrondissement of Montbrison, the canton of Andrézieux-Bouthéon, the Saint-Étienne Métropole, and of Loire's 6th constituency.

According to the national statistics office INSEE, Saint-Galmier is part of the functional urban area (aire d'attraction des villes) of Saint-Étienne, which consists of 105 communes. INSEE also divides the town of Saint-Galmier into two "blocks" (IRIS) to facilitate the statistics of population distribution.

Population
In 2018, the commune of Saint-Galmier had a population of 5,737, ranking 1,903th in France. Of these, 2,782 are men and 2,940 are women, 9.0% are aged 75 and above. The number of foreigners is 1,061, with a population density of 295 per square kilometer. The local population is called Baldomériens (male) or Baldomérienne(female). In 2019, 49 people were born and 91 people died in Saint-Galmier.

Politics

The current mayor of Saint-Galmier is Philippe Denis, a centrist who received 60.11% of the support rate in the 2020 municipal elections.

In the 2017 French presidential election, French 25th President Emmanuel Macron received 66.29% of the support rate in Saint-Galmier.

Water
Saint Galmier is a spa town and the source of Badoit mineral water. The thermal spring was known of in Gallo-Roman times, but its fame increased with the general growth in interest in thermal cures in Europe during the nineteenth century.

Before Auguste Badoit commercialised the water in the 1830s, both the water and the spring from which it emerged, were known as "Fontfort". For this reason, during the French Revolutionary period, the town was briefly known as "Fontfortville".

Personalities
Gilbert Bostsarron, a member of the French Resistance was born here.
Roger Rivière, a professional cyclist, who was born in Saint-Etienne in 1936, died here in 1976.

See also
Communes of the Loire department

References

External links

 
 

Communes of Loire (department)